Albemarle Bertie (c. 1668–1742), of Swinstead, Lincolnshire, was an English Whig politician who sat in the English and British House of Commons between 1705 and 1741.

The fifth son of Robert Bertie, 3rd Earl of Lindsey and his wife Elizabeth Wharton, he successfully contested Lincolnshire for the Whigs at the 1705 English general election. At the 1708 British general election, he stood down at Lincolnshire to make way for his nephew, Lord Willoughby de Eresby and was returned instead for Cockermouth on the interest of his uncle, the 1st Earl of Wharton. He was probably the candidate put up by the Wharton interest at Appleby at the 1710 British general election, who withdrew before the poll expressing a desire to sit no longer in Parliament.

Bertie stood for Lincolnshire again at a by-election in 1721, but was defeated. At the 1734 British general election, he was returned for Boston by his nephew, now the 2nd Duke of Ancaster and Kesteven, but stood down again at the 1741 British general election and died the following year.

References

1660s births
1742 deaths
Younger sons of earls
Members of the Parliament of Great Britain for English constituencies
British MPs 1707–1708
British MPs 1708–1710
British MPs 1734–1741
English MPs 1705–1707
Whig (British political party) MPs for English constituencies
Fellows of All Souls College, Oxford
Albemarle
Whig members of the pre-1707 English Parliament